Rigifila ramosa is one of the two members of the Rigifilida. It differs from the other member Micronuclearia podoventralis by having two pellicular layers covering the cell instead of a single one. Dorsal filopodia are also thicker and more conspicuous than in Micronuclearia.

References 

Eukaryote genera